Peters landlov is a 1963 Danish family film directed by and starring Ebbe Langberg.

Cast
Ebbe Langberg as Sandy
Christoffer Bro as Peter
Jimmie Moore as Billy
Poul Reichhardt as Hr. Berg
Helle Virkner as Minna Berg
Ulla Pia as Lisbeth Berg
Jan Priiskorn-Schmidt as Thomas Berg
Ove Sprogøe as Direktør William H. Schmidt
Emil Hass Christensen as Landsretssagfører Johansen
Minna Jørgensen as Kokkepigen Marie
Carl Ottosen as Kaptajn
Ole Gundermann as Jakob

External links

1963 films
Danish children's films
1960s Danish-language films
Films directed by Ebbe Langberg